Waldeck Castle may refer to the following castles:

Austria
 Waldeck Castle (Carinthia) near Liebenfels-Hardegg in Carinthia
 Waldeck Castle (Upper Austria), burgstall near Diersbach in Upper Austria

Czech Republic
 Waldeck Castle (Middle Bohemia) near Chaloupky in Middle Bohemia

Germany
 Waldeck Castle (Black Forest) in Kohlerstal, Calw, Landkreis Calw, Baden-Württemberg
 Waldeck Castle (Hunsrück) in Dorweiler, Dommershausen, Rhein-Hunsrück-Kreis, Rhineland-Palatinate
 Waldeck Castle (Lorch), near Lorch in the Rheingau, Hesse
 Waldeck Castle (Upper Palatinate), overlooking Waldeck, near Kemnath, Bavaria
 Waldeck Castle (Dinkelsbühl), lost castle near Dinkelsbühl, Middle Franconia, Bavaria
 , also called Schloss Waldeck, in Waldeck, Hesse